Frida, Frieda, or Freida may refer to:

People and fictional characters
Frida (given name), a list of people and fictional characters with the given name 
Frieda (surname), a list of people with the surname
Afroditi Frida (born 1964), Greek singer
Frida (singer) (born 1945), stage name of Anni-Frid Lyngstad, member of the popular pop band ABBA

Arts and entertainment
Frida: A Biography of Frida Kahlo, a 1983 book by Hayden Herrera
Frida (album), a 1971 album by Frida Lyngstad
Frida (film), a 2002 film about artist Frida Kahlo
Frida (opera), a 1991 opera based on the life of Frida Kahlo
Frida (soundtrack), the original soundtrack album to the 2002 film
Frieda (play), a 1946 play by Ronald Millar
Frieda (film), a 1947 British film directed by Basil Dearden and starring Mai Zetterling
Frida (ballet), a 2020 ballet by Annabelle Lopez Ochoa based on the life of Frida Kahlo

Places
Frieda (Werra), a river in Germany
722 Frieda, an asteroid

Other uses
Hurricane Frieda, two tropical cyclones have been named Frieda
Frida (dog), a rescue dog in the Mexican Navy
Frida (magazine), a Swedish magazine
Frieda's Inc., first wholesale produce company in the United States to be founded, owned and operated by a woman

See also
Freda (disambiguation)